Sacred 3 is a hack and slash brawler, part of the Sacred series, despite notable differences in both gameplay and design. Deep Silver, which acquired the license to Sacred 3 from former development studio Ascaron Entertainment, announced at Gamescom that the earliest it could publish the game would be in early 2012. The game was finally released on 1 August 2014. It was met with mixed to negative reception.

Another side-scrolling action brawler called Sacred Citadel acted as a prequel to the Sacred 3 story and released in 2013 to XBLA, PSN and Steam and developed by Southend Interactive.

Gameplay
There are a variety of classes to choose from but those from Sacred 2: Fallen Angel have not returned. They have been replaced by the Safiri Warrior and Ancarian Lancer. Some of the environments from the previous game made a return such as Castle Braverock.

Sacred 3 has four player co-op online and offline. Each ally has his or her own distinct set of active and passive skills. Everyone has a small number of abilities to equip at a time to keep the team from getting overpowered and may allow the combining of team powers to give the player additional ways to take down foes.

Plot
Seraphim – guardians of the legendary "Heart of Ancaria" and their sacred bond between its people had kept the land at peace for centuries, but they've since been forgotten. Lord Zane – ruler of the Ashen Empire – allied himself with Demons, striving to open the gates to the underworld. Bound together by the chains of this evil empire, a resistance of Heroes was forged.

Players will need to defeat the oppressive ruler of Ashen Empire, Zane Ashen, and keep him from obtaining a powerful artifact known as the Heart of Ancaria.

Development
Sacred 3 was developed by Keen Games, for the publisher Deep Silver. Shortly following the Gamescom announcement, Deep Silver called for fan feedback on desired features for Sacred 3 in its official community forums.

In an interview Martin Wein stated: "For the weakness of Sacred 2 I want to mention the Quality Assurance. As a target for Sacred 3 this will be a very important milestone to be taken care of. It's possible to deliver a bug free game." When asked about possible similarities or differences between the sequel and past installments, Wein stated: "We want to keep the charm of the series and you will stumble upon one or another popular character of the prequels."

Reception

The game received "mixed" reviews, according to video game review aggregator Metacritic. The Escapist's Jim Sterling wrote that fans of the series could be disappointed and fans of the hack and slash genre would prefer other titles. Ben "Yahtzee" Croshaw said the game "utterly and completely failed at comedy, action, entertainment and game design" and named it as his fifth worst game of 2014. He also stated in his review that "nothing is more guaranteed to grate than comedy falling flat with smug, blissful unawareness. A grim death march through forced kookiness is worse than a thousand Ride to Hells." He later noted in the footnotes for the same review that he didn't think Sacred 3 was in any way worse than Ride to Hell: Retribution, just that Ride to Hell "left [him] in a better mood".

References

External links

Role-playing video games
Action role-playing video games
Hack and slash role-playing games
Cooperative video games
Fantasy video games
Video games about angels
Video games with downloadable content
Multiplayer online games
PlayStation 3 games
Windows games
Xbox 360 games
Multiplayer and single-player video games
Deep Silver games
2014 video games
Video games developed in Germany